Øivind Husby (born 3 August 1960) is a Norwegian footballer. He played in two matches for the Norway national football team in 1987.

References

External links
 

1960 births
Living people
Norwegian footballers
Norway international footballers
Place of birth missing (living people)
Association footballers not categorized by position